Tiago Casasola (born 11 August 1995) is an Argentine footballer who plays as a defender. He plays for Italian  club Perugia.

Club career

Early career
Casasola started his youth football career at CA Huracan. In August 2012, he moved to Boca Juniors.

Fulham
On 22 August 2014, Casasola transferred to the senior team of English club Fulham for an undisclosed fee. However he failed to play a single game for them during his time there.

Como
His contract with Fulham was terminated by mutual consent and he joined Italian club Como on 29 August 2015. Casasola made his league debut against Vicenza on 19 September 2015. He played 27 league games in the 2015–16 Serie B season.

Roma
At the end of the 2015–16 season, Casasola was released by Como and was signed by Serie A team Roma.

Trapani (loan)
On 5 August 2016, Casasola signed a season-long loan with Serie B side Trapani.

Lazio
On 31 January 2019, his rights were bought by Lazio, and he was loaned back to his previous club Salernitana for the remainder of the 2018–19 season.

Loan to Cosenza
After not playing in the first half of the 2019–20 season, on 30 January 2020 he was loaned to Serie B club Cosenza.

Loan to Salernitana
On 18 September 2020 he returned to Salernitana on loan.

Loans to Frosinone and Cremonese
On 31 August 2021, he was loaned to Frosinone in Serie B. On 27 January 2022, he moved on a new loan to Cremonese in the same league.

Perugia
On 11 July 2022, Casasola moved to Perugia.

International career
Casasola was a member of the Argentina U20 squad for the 2015 FIFA U-20 World Cup and the 2015 South American Youth Football Championship.

Club career statistics

Honours

International
Argentina U20
Winner
 South American Youth Football Championship(1): 2015

References

1995 births
Footballers from Buenos Aires
Argentine people of Italian descent
Living people
Argentine footballers
Argentina under-20 international footballers
Association football defenders
Fulham F.C. players
Como 1907 players
Trapani Calcio players
U.S. Alessandria Calcio 1912 players
U.S. Salernitana 1919 players
Cosenza Calcio players
Frosinone Calcio players
U.S. Cremonese players
A.C. Perugia Calcio players
Serie B players
Serie C players
Argentine expatriate footballers
Expatriate footballers in England
Expatriate footballers in Italy
Argentine expatriate sportspeople in England
Argentine expatriate sportspeople in Italy